My Standard is an album of jazz standards by pianist Paul Bley recorded in Denmark in 1985 and released on the SteepleChase label.

Reception

AllMusic awarded the album 4 stars, stating that Bley "avoids the obvious and comes up with something new to say".

Track listing
 "I'm Glad There Is You" (Jimmy Dorsey, Paul Madeira) – 2:59 Bonus track on CD  
 "Santa Claus Is Coming to Town" (John Frederick Coots, Haven Gillespie) – 3:06   
 "Lover Man" (Jimmy Davis, Ram Ramirez, Jimmy Sherman) – 5:30   
 "All the Things You Are" (Oscar Hammerstein II, Jerome Kern) – 3:02   
 "Long Ago (and Far Away)" (Ira Gershwin, Jerome Kern) – 4:29   
 "Black and Blue" (Harry Brooks, Andy Razaf, Fats Waller) – 4:47   
 "How Long Has This Been Going On?" (George Gershwin, Ira Gershwin) – 2:30 Bonus track on CD   
 "A.R.B." (Paul Bley) – 6:18 Bonus track on CD
 "Blues Waltz" (Bley) – 3:06 Bonus track on CD   
 "I Wish I Knew" (Mack Gordon, Harry Warren) – 3:43   
 "If I'm Lucky" (Eddie DeLange, Josef Myrow) – 3:09   
 "You'd Be So Nice to Come Home To" (Cole Porter) – 4:57   
 "I Can't Get Started" (Vernon Duke, Ira Gershwin) – 4:03   
 "The Theme" (Traditional) - 4:45   
 "Becky" (Bley) – 5:11 Bonus track on CD     
 "Bolivar Blues" (Thelonious Monk) – 2:18 Bonus track on CD     
 "Goodbye" (Gordon Jenkins) – 2:13 Bonus track on CD

Personnel 
Paul Bley – piano
Jesper Lundgaard – bass 
Billy Hart – drums

References 

1986 albums
Paul Bley albums
SteepleChase Records albums